State Highway 95 (SH 95) is a state highway which connects the cities of Yoakum and Temple in the U.S. state of Texas.

Route description
SH 95 runs northward from  Alt. US 77 at the northern edge of Yoakum. It travels through Shiner (crossing  Alt. US 90), Moulton, Flatonia (intersecting  US 90 and Interstate 10), Smithville, Bastrop, Elgin (meeting  US 290), and Taylor (crossing  US 79) before ending at  US 190 in Temple.

The portion of SH 95 from  SH 71 to  US 290 has been designated part of the 10th Mountain Division Highway.

History
The route was designated on April 21, 1924 along a route from Taylor to Elgin. On April 6, 1932, it extended south to Hochheim, replacing SH 109, and extended north to Temple, replacing part of SH 2B. On July 15, 1935, the section from Elgin to Flatonia was cancelled, creating a gap. On February 21, 1937, the section from Elgin to Bastrop was restored, partially closing the gap. On February 9, 1939, the road had already been improved from Elgin to Sayersville and this completed the connection to Bastrop. The Works Progress Administration funded the $109,000 relief project.
On September 26, 1939, the section from Yoakum to Hochheim was transferred to SH 111, and the section from Flatonia to Yoakum was renumbered to SH 297, eliminating the gap. On November 20, 1939, before signage was changed, SH 297 was changed back to SH 95, creating a gap between Flatonia and Bastrop. On May 29, 1941, the section of SH 95 from Flatonia north to Smithville was restored as a temporary route and SH 95 was concurrent with SH 71 between Bastrop and Smithville, closing the gap. The temporary route later became the permanent route because TxDOT could not construct a more direct route for SH 95 from Bastrop to Flatonia. On November 24, 1978, the section from SH 53 to SH 36 in Temple was cancelled and transferred to Loop 363.

Major intersections

References

095
Transportation in Bastrop County, Texas
Transportation in Bell County, Texas
Transportation in Fayette County, Texas
Transportation in Lavaca County, Texas
Transportation in Travis County, Texas
Transportation in Williamson County, Texas